The 1969 CONCACAF Championship was the fourth edition of the CONCACAF Championship, the football championship of North America, Central America and the Caribbean (CONCACAF). The tournament was held between 23 November to 8 December. Six teams participated in the tournament.

The event was hosted by Costa Rica in the city of San José. Seven teams qualified, but Haiti's disqualification left six teams to play in the round-robin format to determine the winner. The tournament was won by the host nation, for the second time after 1963, by tying defending champions Guatemala 1–1 in the deciding final match.

Qualifying Tournament

Venue

Final tournament

Awards

Scorers
4 goals

 Víctor Ruiz

3 goals

 Nelson Melgar
 Marco Fión

2 goals

 Álvaro Cascante
 Roy Sáenz
 Jaime Grant
 Regales
 Melvin Loefstok
 Martijn
 Adelbert Toppenberg
 Ulrich Haynes

1 goal

 Carlos Santana
 Wálter Elizondo
 Vicente Wanchope
 Tomás Gamboa
 Daniel Salamanca
 Rolando Valdez
 Meulens
 Croens
 Francisco Mancilla
 Alfonso Sabater
 José Crespo
 Leopoldo Barba
 Everald Cummings
 Keith Douglas
 Delroy Scott
 Joshua Hamilton
 David Largie

Own goals
 Edwin Dawkins (for Costa Rica)

References

External links

spanish 

 
CONCACAF Championship
International association football competitions hosted by Costa Rica
Championship
1969–70 in Guatemalan football
1969–70 in Costa Rican football
1969–70 in Jamaican football
1969–70 in Mexican football
Sports competitions in San José, Costa Rica
20th century in San José, Costa Rica
November 1969 sports events in North America
December 1969 sports events in North America